Tyron Lamar "Bennie" Anderson (born February 17, 1977) is a former American football guard. He played collegiately at Tennessee State University.

High school and college careers
Anderson attended Cleveland Junior Naval Academy in St. Louis, Missouri where he was an all-district performer.

He was a four-year letterman at Tennessee State (1996–99) where he started 43 of the 45 games in which he played during his career. He was a first-team All-Ohio Valley Conference pick as both a junior and senior, when he also earned the school’s leadership award by the “Tree Coaches” (Tennessee State alumni coaches who sit under a tree watching practice).He was a first-team Black College All-America pick as a senior in 1999.

Professional career

2000
Anderson was initially signed by the St. Louis Rams in 2000 as an undrafted rookie free agent. He was waived by the team on July 19 and spent rest of the year out of football.

2001
Anderson resurfaced with the Chicago Enforcers of the now defunct XFL in the spring of 2001. He started at right guard for the Enforcers the entire season, paving the way for former NFL running backs LeShon Johnson and John Avery (also a former first-round pick by the Miami Dolphins).

Later that year, Anderson would go on to play in all 16 regular season games with 13 starts at right guard for the Baltimore Ravens. After seeing action in a reserve role in the first two regular season games, he made the first start of his NFL career at the Denver Broncos on September 30 as the Ravens rushed for 112 yards and the line did not allow a sack in a 20-13 victory. Anderson also opened both playoff games.

2002
Anderson started all 16 games at right guard for the Ravens in 2002. He was one of only three Ravens offensive players to start all 16 games that year. He was part of a line that led the way for a running game that averaged 112.0 yards per contest and put together a 4.2-yard average per attempt as running back Jamal Lewis rushed for 1,327 yards and reached the 100-yard rushing mark in five games.

2003
Anderson opened all 15 regular season games in which he played at right guard for the Ravens in 2003. He dressed but did not play in the finale against the Pittsburgh Steelers.  He was part of a line that paved the way for Jamal Lewis, who put together the second-best individual rushing performance in NFL history with 2,066 yards. Anderson also opened first-round playoff game against the Tennessee Titans on January 3, 2004.

2004
In his final season with the Ravens, Anderson played in all 16 contests, including 12 starts at right guard. He also saw action at left guard during the course of the season. He was an integral part of a line that led a running game which averaged 128.9 yards per contest and allowed 2.2 sacks an outing. Behind the line, running backs Jamal Lewis (4) and Chester Taylor (2) combined for six 100-yard rushing games.

2005
After the Ravens signed free agent offensive guard Keydrick Vincent from the Pittsburgh Steelers in early 2005, it became clear they had no interest in re-signing Anderson. He signed with the Buffalo Bills on March 19. The contract was a three-year deal worth $5.1 million. It also featured a $400,000 bonus if he met certain playing-time incentives.

Anderson started 15 of the 16 games in which he appeared at left guard for the Bills. The only game he did not open was against the Kansas City Chiefs on November 13, when he was replaced by Mike Williams after struggling with pass protection. Anderson re-assumed the role after Williams was injured on November 27. During the year, Anderson was part of a line that led the way for running back Willis McGahee, who compiled his second straight 1,000-yard rushing season with 1,247 yards.

2006
Anderson was expected to have the edge on the starting left guard position for the Bills in 2006, but was waived by the team on June 9. On June 15, he signed a to a two-year contract with the Miami Dolphins. The move reunited him with Mike Mularkey, who was the head coach for the Bills in 2004 and 2005 before becoming the offensive coordinator in Miami.

He initially assumed the starting right guard job after injuries to Seth McKinney and rookie Joe Toledo. Anderson started the first two games of the regular season at right guard before being injured on September 17 against his former team, the Buffalo Bills. The injury, which proved to be a torn triceps, landed Anderson on Injured Reserve. He was replaced by Kendyl Jacox and later L. J. Shelton at right guard.

Personal life
Bennie is married with three sons. He earned a degree in history at Tennessee State and has subsequently obtained his teaching certificate. He has said he would like to get into a career in education following his playing days, possibly even starting his own school in St. Louis, Missouri. Bennie is currently a lineman coach for Elite Football Academy of Chesterfield, Missouri.

References

1977 births
Living people
American football offensive guards
Baltimore Ravens players
Buffalo Bills players
Miami Dolphins players
Tennessee State Tigers football players
Players of American football from St. Louis